Kerewan is a town in the Gambia. Located beside the Miniminiyang Bolong, about 60 km from the capital Banjul. It is the seat of the Kerewan Local Government Area (formerly the North Bank Division), located on the north bank of the lower river Gambia.

The population of the Kerewan LGA was 225,516 at the 2013 population census, with about 3,500 people in Kerewan town.

People in the Kerewan LGA are mainly known for agriculture and the main crops are groundnut, rice, maize, and millet.

References

North Bank Division
Populated places in the Gambia
Local Government Areas of the Gambia